The Pembina Hills School Division, (formerly known as Pembina Hills Regional Division No. 7 and Pembina Hills Public Schools) is a school division headquartered in Barrhead, Alberta.

The division, with 16 schools having a total of about 3,700 students as of 2021, provides public education to the following central Alberta communities: the towns of Barrhead, Swan Hills, and Westlock, and the Village of Clyde, as well as the counties of Barrhead, Westlock, and Woodlands County. Sections of Big Lakes County and Municipal District of Lesser Slave River No. 124 to the southeast and south are also in this school district.

History
The division was created on January 1, 1995 from the County of Barrhead No. 11 school district, Swan Hills School District No. 5109, and Westlock School Division No. 37, which combined into a single school district.

It was established during a wave of school board amalgamations in Alberta, during the Progressive Conservative government of Ralph Klein. Pembina Hills School Division was the result of a voluntary merger of Westlock School Division No. 37, the educational component of the County of Barrhead No. 11 and Swan Hills School District No. 5109.

Prior to that union, the Barrhead and Westlock areas had previously been part of a regional school division, Pembina School Division No. 37, which was split in 1947 into the Westlock and Barrhead School Divisions.  In 1959, the Municipal District of Barrhead consolidated with the school district to form a county.  The first school district in Swan Hills (Oil Hills School District No. 5109) was not formed until 1959.

Schools 
Two schools are for Hutterites and two are "outreach" schools.

 Barrhead Composite High School, Barrhead, Grades 7-12
 Barrhead Outreach, Barrhead, Grades 7-12
 Barrhead Elementary School, Barrhead, Kindergarten-Grade 6 (French Immersion)
 Busby School, Busby, Kindergarten-Grade 6
 Pembina North Community School, Dapp, Kindergarten-Grade 9
 Dunstable School, rural County of Barrhead near Busby, Kindergarten-Grade 6
 Eleanor Hall School, Clyde, Kindergarten-Grade 9
 Fort Assiniboine School, Fort Assiniboine Kindergarten-Grade 9
 Pibroch Colony School, Pibroch Hutterite Colony near Westlock Grades 1-9
 Neerlandia Public Christian School, Neerlandia, Kindergarten-Grade 9
 R.F. Staples Secondary School, Westlock, AB, Grades 7-12 (French Immersion 7-9)
 Sunny Bend Colony School, Sunny Bend Hutterite Colony near Westlock, Grades 1-9
 Swan Hills School, Swan Hills, Kindergarten-Grade 12
 Vista Virtual School, virtual school (office in Edmonton), Grades 1-12
 Westlock Elementary School, Westlock, Kindergarten-Grade 6 (French Immersion)
 Westlock Outreach, Westlock, Grades 7-12

References

External links
 Pembina Hills Public Schools
 

School districts in Alberta
Barrhead, Alberta
Westlock County
1995 establishments in Alberta
Educational institutions established in 1995